is the first single by Japanese girl group HKT48.

Release 
Suki! Suki! Skip! was released in Japan on March 20, 2013 in four different versions: Type A, Type B, Type C and the Theater versions.

This is the first time since the formation of all Project 48 groups (AKB48, SKE48, NMB48, HKT48), the center position belongs to a research student, Meru Tashima.

Also, this single is the first time a CD cover has featured only one girl (Meru Tashima) for AKB48's sister groups.

Track listing

Type-A 

Kataomoi no Karaage was the ending theme to Japanese dub of My Little Pony: Friendship is Magic during its first season.

Type-B

Type-C

Theater Edition

Members

"Suki! Suki! Skip!" 
 Team H : Chihiro Anai,  Nao Ueki, Aika Ota, Haruka Kodama, Rino Sashihara, Yuki Shimono, Chiyori Nakanishi, Natsumi Matsuoka, Sakura Miyawaki, Anna Murashige, Aoi Motomura, Madoka Moriyasu, Haruka Wakatabe
 Kenkyuusei : Meru Tashima, Mio Tomonaga, Mai Fuchigami

"Onegai Valentine" 
 Team H : Chihiro Anai,  Nao Ueki, Aika Ota, Haruka Kodama, Rino Sashihara, Yuki Shimono, Chiyori Nakanishi, Natsumi Matsuoka, Sakura Miyawaki, Anna Murashige, Aoi Motomura, Madoka Moriyasu, Haruka Wakatabe
 Kenkyuusei : Meru Tashima, Mio Tomonaga, Mai Fuchigami

"Kataomoi no Karage" 
 Team H: Sakura Miyawaki, Aika Ota, Aoi Motomura, Anna Murashige, Haruka Wakatabe
 Kenkyuusei: Meru Tashima, Mio Tomonaga, Marina Yamada, Izumi Umemoto, Yuka Akiyoshi, Maiko Fukagawa, Yuka Tanaka

"Ima ga Ichiban" 
 Team H : Chihiro Anai, Serina Kumazawa, Haruka Kodama, Rino Sashihara, Natsumi Tanaka, Chiyori Nakanishi, Natsumi Matsuoka, Madoka Moriyasu
 Kenkyuusei : Kyouka Abe, Mina Imada, Marika Tani, Riko Sakaguchi

Oricon Charts

References

Further reading

External links 
 HKT48 Discography 
 Universal Music Japan (HKT48) Profile - Discography 
 

2013 debut singles
Japanese-language songs
HKT48 songs
Oricon Weekly number-one singles